Chahar Qash-e Talkhab (also Romanized as Chahār Qāsh-e Talkhāb) is a village in Rostam-e Seh Rural District, Sorna District, Rostam County, Fars Province, Iran. At the 2006 census, its population was 13, in 4 families.

References 

Populated places in Rostam County